Lapsiphedi is a village and former Village Development Committee that is now part of Shankharapur Municipality in Kathmandu District in Province No. 3 of central Nepal. At the time of the 1991 Nepal census it had a population of 5,040 spread over 919 households.

References

Populated places in Kathmandu District